The National Prohibition Act, known informally as the Volstead Act, was an act of the 66th United States Congress, designed to carry out the intent of the 18th Amendment (ratified January 1919), which established the prohibition of alcoholic drinks. The Anti-Saloon League's Wayne Wheeler conceived and drafted the bill, which was named after Andrew Volstead, chairman of the House Judiciary Committee, who managed the legislation.

Procedure 
The Eighteenth Amendment to the United States Constitution prohibited the production, sale, and transport of "intoxicating liquors," but it did not define "intoxicating liquors" or provide penalties. It granted both the federal government and the states the power to enforce the ban by "appropriate legislation." A bill to do so was introduced in the United States Congress in 1919. The act was voided by the ratification of the Twenty-first Amendment in 1933.

The bill was vetoed by President Woodrow Wilson on October 27, 1919, largely on technical grounds, because it also covered wartime prohibition, but his veto was overridden by the House on the same day and by the Senate one day later.

The three distinct purposes of the Act were:
 to prohibit intoxicating beverages such as liquor, beer and alcohol,
 to regulate the manufacture, production, use, and sale of high-proof spirits for other than beverage purposes,
 to ensure an ample supply of alcohol and promote its use in scientific research and in the development of fuel, dye, and other lawful industries.

It provided further that: "No person shall on or after the date when the eighteenth amendment to the Constitution of the United States goes into effect, manufacture, sell, barter, transport, import, export, deliver, furnish or possess any intoxicating liquor except as authorized in this Act, and all the provisions of this Act shall be liberally construed to the end that the use of intoxicating liquor as a beverage may be prevented."

The act defined intoxicating liquor as any beverage containing 0.5% or more alcohol by volume and superseded all existing prohibition laws in effect in states that had such legislation. The extremely low limit on allowed alcohol content, banning wine and beer, took many around the country by surprise, even Prohibition supporters.

Enforcement and impact
The production, importation, and distribution of alcoholic beverages—once the province of legitimate business—was taken over by criminal gangs, which fought each other for market control in violent confrontations, including murder. Major gangsters, such as Omaha's Tom Dennison and Chicago's Al Capone, became rich, and were admired locally and nationally. Enforcement was difficult because the gangs became so rich that they were often able to bribe underpaid and understaffed law-enforcement personnel, and afford expensive lawyers. Many citizens were sympathetic to bootleggers, and respectable citizens were lured by the romance of illegal speakeasies, also called "blind tigers." The loosening of social mores during the 1920s included popularizing the cocktail and the cocktail party among higher socioeconomic groups. Those inclined to help authorities were often intimidated and even murdered. In several major cities – notably those that served as major points of liquor importation, including Chicago and Detroit – gangs wielded significant political power. A Michigan State Police raid on Detroit's Deutsches Haus once netted the mayor, the sheriff, and the local congressman.

Prohibition came into force at 12:00:01 am on January 17, 1920, and the first documented infringement of the Volstead Act occurred in Chicago on January 17 at 12:59 am. According to police reports, six armed men stole $100,000 worth of "medicinal" whiskey from two freight-train cars. This trend in bootlegging liquor created a domino effect among criminals across the United States. Some gang leaders had been stashing liquor months before the Volstead Act was enforced. The ability to sustain a lucrative business in bootlegging liquor was largely helped by the minimal police surveillance at the time. There were only 134 agents designated by the Prohibition Unit to cover all of Illinois, Iowa, and parts of Wisconsin. According to Charles C. Fitzmorris, Chicago's chief of police during the beginning of the Prohibition period, "Sixty percent of my police [were] in the bootleg business."

Section 29 of the Act allowed 200 gallons (the equivalent of about 1000 750-ml bottles) of "non-intoxicating cider and fruit juice" to be made each year at home. Initially "intoxicating" was defined as exceeding 0.5% alcohol by volume, but the Bureau of Internal Revenue struck that down in 1920, effectively legalizing home winemaking. For beer, however, the 0.5% limit remained until 1933. Some vineyards embraced the sale of grapes for making wine at home. Zinfandel grapes were popular among home winemakers living near vineyards, but their tight bunches left their thin skins vulnerable to rot from rubbing and abrasion on the long journey to East Coast markets. The thick skins of Alicante Bouschet were less susceptible to rot, so that and similar varieties were widely planted for the home winemaking market.

The Act contained a number of exceptions and exemptions. Many of them were used to evade the law's intended purpose. For example, the Act allowed a physician to prescribe whiskey for his patients but limited the amount that could be prescribed. Subsequently, the House of Delegates of the American Medical Association voted to submit to Congress a bill to remove the limit on the amount of whiskey that could be prescribed and questioned the ability of a legislature to determine the therapeutic value of any substance. Vine-Glo was produced ostensibly to let people make grape juice from concentrate but it included a warning on its packaging telling people how to make wine from it.

According to Neely, "The Act called for trials for anyone charged with an alcohol-related offense, and juries often failed to convict. Under the state of New York's Mullan–Gage Act, a short-lived local version of the Volstead Act, the first 4,000 arrests led to just six convictions and not one jail sentence".

While the production, transport and sale of intoxicating liquor was illegal, their purchase was ruled legal in United States v. Norris.

Repeal
Prohibition lost support because ignoring the law gained increasing social acceptance and organized-crime violence increased. By 1933, public opposition to prohibition had become overwhelming. In March of that year, Congress passed the Cullen–Harrison Act, which legalized "3.2 beer" (i.e., beer containing 3.2% alcohol by weight or 4% by volume) and wines of similarly low alcohol content, rather than the 0.5% limit defined by the original Volstead Act.

In February 1933, Congress passed the Blaine Act, a proposed constitutional amendment to repeal the Eighteenth Amendment to end prohibition. On December 5, 1933, Utah became the 36th state to ratify the Twenty-first Amendment, which repealed the Eighteenth Amendment, voiding the Volstead Act and restoring control of alcohol to the states. All states either made alcohol legal, or passed control over alcohol production and consumption to the counties and provinces they comprise. That led to the creation of dry counties, most of which are in the South.

See also 
Prohibition in the United States
 Bureau of Alcohol, Tobacco, Firearms and Explosives
 Medicinal Liquor Prescriptions Act of 1933
 Comprehensive Drug Abuse Prevention and Control Act of 1970

References

Further reading

External links 
 National Prohibition Act (Volstead Act) in MNopedia, the Minnesota Encyclopedia

Prohibition in the United States
Repealed United States legislation
United States federal criminal legislation
1919 in law
1919 in the United States
66th United States Congress